Hango may refer to:
Hangö, the Swedish name of the bilingual port town of Hanko, Uusimaa, Finland
Remote Solution, South Korean electronics company formerly known as HanGo Electronics
Hango Hill, hill near Castletown, Isle of Man

People with the name Hango include:
Hango (general), second-in-command of Atoc at the Battle of Chimborazo
Angeline Hango (1905–1995), Canadian writer
Keithley Hango, founder of Vanuatu's Pentecost Star